Sōtatsu is a crater on Mercury.  Its name was adopted by the IAU in 1976, after the Japanese artist Tawaraya Sōtatsu.

The craters Tintoretto and Po Ya are to the northwest of Sōtatsu.

References

Impact craters on Mercury